The Margaret Collier Award is a lifetime achievement award, presented by the Academy of Canadian Cinema and Television, to a Canadian writer for their outstanding body of work in film or television. Formerly presented as part of the Gemini Awards, since 2013 it has been part of the Canadian Screen Awards. It can be presented to an individual writer or writing team.

The award is named in honour of Margaret Collier, the longtime executive director of ACTRA's chapter for television writers.

The recipient of this award is selected upon the recommendation of the Academy's television division writer's branch with ratification from the Academy's board of directors.

Past recipients
1986 - Charles E. Israel 
1987 - Grahame Woods 
1988 - M. Charles Cohen 
1989 - Donald Brittain 
1990 - Ted Allan 
1992 - Harry Rasky 
1993 - George R. Robertson 
1994 - Alex Barris 
1995 - Timothy Findley 
1996 - Anna Sandor 
1998 - Douglas Bowie 
1998 - Frank Shuster, Johnny Wayne for their collaborations as Wayne & Shuster. Frank Shuster accepted the award as Wayne had died in 1989.
1999 - Suzette Couture 
2000 - Rob Forsyth 
2001 - David Barlow 
2002 - Patrick Watson 
2003 - Charles Lazer
2004 - Wayne Grigsby
2005 - not presented
2006 - Pete White
2007 - Susan Marcus, Chris Clark, Lilly Barnes, Joy Simons-Newall
2008 - David Cole
2009 - Barbara Samuels
2010 - Donald Martin
2011 - Bob Carney
2013 - Heather Conkie
2014 - Semi Chellas
2015 - Tassie Cameron
2016 - Karen Walton
2017 - Denis McGrath
2018 - Brad Wright
2019 - David Shore

See also

 Canadian television awards

References

Gemini Awards
Lifetime achievement awards
Canadian Screen Award television categories
Screenwriting awards for television